The Tengwar script is an artificial script, one of several scripts created by J. R. R. Tolkien, the author of The Lord of the Rings.

Within the fictional context of Middle-earth, the Tengwar were invented by the Elf Fëanor, and used first to write the Elven tongues Quenya and Telerin. Later a great number of Tolkien's constructed languages were written using the Tengwar, including Sindarin. Tolkien used Tengwar to write English: most of Tolkien's Tengwar samples are actually in English.

Internal history and terminology 

According to J.R.R. Tolkien's The War of the Jewels, edited by his son Christopher Tolkien, at the time Fëanor created his script, he introduced a change in terminology. He called a letter, a written representation of a spoken phoneme (tengwë), a  tengwa. Previously, any letter or symbol had been called a sarat (from *sar "incise"). The alphabet of Rúmil of Tirion, on which Fëanor supposedly based his own work, was known as Sarati. It later became known as "Tengwar of Rúmil".

The plural of tengwa is tengwar, and this is the name by which Fëanor's writing system became known. Since, however, in commonly used modes, an individual tengwa was equivalent to a consonant, the term tengwar in the fiction became equivalent to "consonant sign", and the vowel signs were known as ómatehtar. By loan-translation, the tengwar became known as tîw (singular têw) in Sindarin, when they were introduced to Beleriand. The letters of the earlier alphabet native to Sindarin were called cirth (singular certh, probably from *kirte "cutting", and thus semantically analogous to Quenya sarat). This term was loaned into exilic Quenya as certa, plural certar.

External history

Precursors

The sarati, a script developed by Tolkien in the late 1910s and described in Parma Eldalamberon 13, anticipates many features of the tengwar: vowel representation by diacritics (which is found in many tengwar varieties); different tengwar shapes; and a few correspondences between sound features and letter shape features (though inconsistent).

Even closer to the tengwar is the Valmaric script, described in Parma Eldalamberon 14, which Tolkien used from about 1922 to 1925. It features many tengwar shapes, the inherent vowel  found in some tengwar varieties, and the tables in the samples V12 and V13 show an arrangement that is very similar to one of the primary tengwar in the classical Quenya "mode".

Jim Allan in his An Introduction to Elvish compared the tengwar with the Universal Alphabet by the London merchant Francis Lodwick of 1686, both on grounds of the correspondence between shape features and sound features, and of the actual letter shapes.

Tengwar

The tengwar script was probably developed in the late 1920s or in the early 1930s. The Lonely Mountain Jar Inscription, the first published Tengwar sample, dates to 1937. The full explanation of the tengwar was published in Appendix E of The Lord of the Rings in 1955.

The Mellonath Daeron Index of Tengwar Specimina (DTS) lists most of the known samples of tengwar by Tolkien.

There are only a few known samples predating publication of The Lord of the Rings (many of them published posthumously):

 The Lonely Mountain Jar Inscription, published 1937
 Middle Page from the Book of Mazarbul
 Last Page from the Book of Mazarbul, Last Line, this and the above one originally prepared for inclusion in The Lord of the Rings
 Steinborg Drawing Title
 Ilbereth's Greeting from The Father Christmas Letters, dating to 1937
 The Treebeard Page
 Edwin Lowdham's Manuscript from The Notion Club Papers has Old English language text written in tengwar (with a few Adûnaic and Quenya words), dating to 1945/6.
 The Brogan Tengwa-greetings, appearing in The Letters of J. R. R. Tolkien, No. 118, tentatively dated to 1948

The following samples presumably predate the Lord of the Rings, but were not explicitly dated: 

 Elvish Script Sample I, II, III, with parts of the English poems Errantry and Bombadil, first published in the Silmarillion Calendar 1978, later in Pictures by J. R. R. Tolkien, 
 So Lúthien, a page of the English Lay of Leithian text

Description

Letters 

The most notable characteristic of the tengwar script is that the shapes of the letters correspond to the distinctive features of the sounds they represent. The Quenya consonant system has five places of articulation: labial, dental, palatal, velar, and glottal. The velars distinguish between plain and labialized (that is, articulated with rounded lips, or followed by a  sound). Each point of articulation, and the corresponding tengwa series, has a name in the classical Quenya mode. Dental sounds are called  Tincotéma and are represented with the tengwar in column I. Labial sounds are called Parmatéma, and represented by the column II tengwar; velar sounds are called Calmatéma, represented by column III; and labialized velar sounds are called Quessetéma, represented by the tengwar of column IV. Palatal sounds are called Tyelpetéma and have no tengwa series of their own, but are represented by column III letters with an added diacritic for following .

Similarly shaped letters reflect not only similar places of articulation, but also similar manners of articulation. In the classical Quenya mode, row 1 represents voiceless stops, row 2 voiced prenasalized stops, row 3 voiceless fricatives, row 4 voiceless prenasalized stops, row 5 nasal stops, and row 6 approximants.

Regularly formed 

Most letters are constructed by a combination of two basic shapes: a vertical stem (either long or short) and either one or two rounded bows (which may or may not be underscored, and may be on the left or right of the stem).

These principal letters are divided into four series ("témar") that correspond to the main places of articulation and into six grades ("tyeller") that correspond to the main manners of articulation. Both vary among modes.

Each series is headed by the basic signs composed of a vertical stem descending below the line, and a single bow. These basic signs represent the voiceless stop consonants for that series.

In rows of the general use, there are the following correspondences between letter shapes and manners of articulation:

 Doubling the bow turns the voiceless consonant into a voiced one.
 Raising the stem above the line turns it into the corresponding fricative.
 Shortening it (so it is only the height of the bow) creates the corresponding nasal. In most modes, the signs with shortened stem and single bow do not correspond to the voiceless nasals, but to the approximants.

In addition to these variations of the tengwar shapes, there is yet another variation, the use of stems that are extended both above and below the line. This shape may correspond to other consonant variations required. The tengwar with raised stems sometimes occur in glyph variants that look like extended stems, as seen in the inscription of the One Ring.

An example from the parmatéma (the signs with a closed bow on the right side) in the "general use" of the tengwar is:

 The basic sign, named parma, (with descending stem) represents  (it happens to look much like the Latin letter P).
 With the bow doubled, umbar, it represents .
 With a raised stem, formen, it represents .
 With a raised stem and a doubled bow, ampa, it represents generally  but possibly  (depending upon the language).
 With a short stem and double bow, it represents .
 With short stem and single bow, vala, it represents , or  if that has the phonological behaviour of a sonorant (e.g. in Quenya).

In languages such as Quenya, which do not contain any voiced fricatives other than "v", the raised stem + doubled bow row is used for the common nasal+stop sequences (nt, mp, nk, nqu). In such cases, the "w" sign in the previous paragraph is used for "v". In the mode of Beleriand, found on the door to Moria, the bottom tyellë is used for nasals (e.g., vala is used for ) and the fifth tyellë for doubled nasals ( for ).

Irregularly formed 

There are additional letters that do not have regular shapes. Their use varies considerably from mode to mode. Some aficionados have added more letters not found in Tolkien's writings for use in their modes.

Tehtar

A tehta (Quenya "marking") is a diacritic placed above or below the tengwa. They can represent vowels, consonant doubling, or nasal sound.

As Tolkien explained in Appendix E of The Lord of the Rings, the tehtar for vowels resemble Latin diacritics: circumflex (î) , acute (í) , dot (i) , left curl (ı̔) , and right curl (ı̓) . Long vowels, excepting , may be indicated by doubling the signs.

A vowel occurring alone is drawn on the vowel carrier, which resembles dotless i (ı) for a short vowel or dotless j (ȷ) for a long vowel.

Modes 

Just as with any alphabetic writing system, every specific language written in tengwar requires a specific orthography, depending on the phonology of that language. These tengwar orthographies are usually called modes. Some modes follow pronunciation, while others follow traditional orthography.

The other main difference is in the fourth tyellë below, where those letters with raised stems and doubled bows can be either voiced fricatives, as in Sindarin (general mode at right), or nasalized stops, as in Quenya (classical mode).

Ómatehtar

In some modes, called ómatehtar (or vowel tehtar) modes, the vowels are represented with diacritics called tehtar (Quenya for 'signs'; corresponding singular: tehta, 'sign'). These ómatehtar modes can be loosely considered abjads rather than true alphabets. In some ómatehtar modes, the consonant signs feature an inherent vowel. These ómatehtar modes can be considered alphasyllabaries.

Ómatehtar modes can vary in that the vowel stroke can be placed either on top of the consonant preceding it, as in Quenya, or on the consonant following, as in Sindarin, English, and the notorious Black Speech inscription on the One Ring.

Full writing

In the full writing modes, the consonants and the vowels are represented by Tengwar. Only one such mode is well known. It is called the "mode of Beleriand" and one can read it on the Doors of Durin.

Modes for other languages

Since the publication of the first official description of the Tengwar at the end of The Lord of the Rings, others have created modes for other languages such as English, Spanish, German, Swedish, French, Finnish, Italian, Hungarian and Welsh. Modes have also been devised for other constructed languages; Esperanto and Lojban.

Tolkien had used multiple modes for English, including full writing and ómatehtar alphabetic modes, phonetic full modes and phonetic ómatehtar modes known from documents published after his death.

Encoding schemes

Legacy encoding

The contemporary de facto standard in the tengwar user community maps the tengwar characters onto the ISO 8859-1 character encoding following the example of the tengwar typefaces by Dan Smith. This implies a major flaw: If no corresponding tengwar font is installed, a string of nonsense characters appears.

Since there are not enough places in ISO 8859-1's 191 codepoints for all the signs used in tengwar orthography, certain signs are included in a "tengwar A" font which also maps its characters on ISO 8859-1, overlapping with the first font.

For each tengwar diacritic, there are four different codepoints that are used depending on the width of the character which bears it.

Other tengwar typefaces with this encoding include Johan Winge's Tengwar Annatar, Måns Björkman's Tengwar Parmaitë,  Enrique Mombello's Tengwar Élfica or Michal Nowakowski's Tengwar Formal (note that most of these differ in details).

The following sample shows the first article of the Universal Declaration of Human Rights written in English, according to the traditional English orthography. It should look similar to the picture at the top of the page, but if no tengwar font is installed, it will appear as a jumble of characters because the corresponding ISO 8859-1 characters will appear instead.

j#¸ 9t&5# w`Vb%_ 6EO w6Y5 e7`V`V 2{( zèVj# 5% 2x%51T`Û 2{( 7v%1+- 4hR 7EO 2{$yYO2 y4% 7]F85^ 2{( z5^8I`B5$I( 2{( dyYj2 zE1 1yY6E2_ 5^( 5#4^(7 5% `C 8q7T1T W w74^(692^H -- 

Note: Some browsers may not display these characters properly.

Unicode

A proposal has been made by Michael Everson to include the tengwar in the Unicode standard. The codepoints are subject to change; the range  to U+160FF in the SMP is tentatively allocated for tengwar according to the current Unicode roadmap.

ConScript Unicode Registry

Tengwar are currently included in the unofficial ConScript Unicode Registry (CSUR), which assigns codepoints in the Private Use Area. Tengwar are mapped to the range U+E000 to U+E07F; see External links. The following Unicode sample (which repeats the one above) is meaningful when viewed under a typeface supporting tengwar glyphs in the area defined in the ConScript tengwar proposal.

            ⸬                   ⸬

Some typefaces that support this proposal are Everson Mono, Tengwar Telcontar, Constructium, Tengwar Formal Unicode, and FreeMonoTengwar (James Kass's Code2000 and Code2001 use an older, incompatible version of the proposal). The eight “Aux” variant fonts of Kurinto (Kurinto Text Aux, Book Aux, Sans Aux, etc.) also support Tengwar.

In popular culture 
Tengwar has been used in Tolkien fandom since the publication of The Lord of the Rings in the 1950s.

Tengwar script appears in a bound volume in the Within Temptation music video for "Stand My Ground" (2004), though it appears to be a random selection of letters, with a Tehta vowel appearing about every five words or so. Many tengwar are also repeated for no apparent reason. Another instance of this stylistic use of tengwar is the computer game Atlantis: The Lost Tales (1997); again the tengwar are used meaninglessly. Tengwar is also used in Alone in the Dark, a comic book, as a typeface describing an arcane language.

 
With the exception of John Rhys-Davies, the actors playing the Fellowship of the Ring in The Lord of the Rings film trilogy have tattoos of the English word nine written in Quenya-mode tengwar.

Footballers such as Sergio Agüero and Fernando Torres have tattoos with their first name in Tengwar on their forearms.

See also 
 Sarati
 Cirth
 A Elbereth Gilthoniel
 Elvish languages (Middle-earth)
 Namárië

References

Sources 

For a list of linguistic material by Tolkien published in the journals Parma Eldalamberon and Vinyar Tengwar, see bibliography in Elvish languages (Middle-earth).

 Derzhanski, Ivan A. "The Fëanorian Tengwar and the Typology of Phonetic Writing Systems." Vinyar Tengwar 41 (2000): 20–23.
 Hostetter, Carl F. ""Si man i-yulmar n(g)win enquatuva": A Newly-Discovered Tengwar Inscription." Vinyar Tengwar 21 (1992): 6–10.
 Smith, Arden R., Irmengard Rauch and Gerald F. Carr. "The Semiotics of the Writing Systems of Tolkien's Middle-earth." In Semiotics around the World: Synthesis in Diversity, I-II, ed. Irmengard Rauch, 1239–42. Berlin, Germany: Mouton de Gruyter, 1997.

External links 

 Amanye Tenceli – The Tengwar A general presentation by Måns Björkman of the tengwar script, with some extrapolations.
 The Mellonath Daeron Index of Tengwar Specimina — a continuously expanding list of published Tengwar samples
 Official proposal to encode tengwar in Unicode
 Tengwar proposal for ConScript Unicode Registry
 A comprehensive list of tengwar fonts
 Free Tengwar Font Project, a project promoting free and open tengwar fonts mapped into Unicode private use code points

Abugida writing systems
Alphabets
Middle-earth writing systems
Writing systems introduced in 1937
Miscellaneous Unicode blocks